La Trobe may refer to:
 Charles La Trobe (1801–1875), the first lieutenant-governor of the state of Victoria, Australia

Places in Australia named after Charles La Trobe:
 La Trobe University, Victoria
 Latrobe Valley, Victoria
 City of Latrobe, a local government area of Victoria
 La Trobe Street, Melbourne, Victoria
 Mount LaTrobe, Wilsons Promontory, Victoria - 754m peak
 Division of La Trobe, Australian Electoral Division, Victoria
 Latrobe, a town in Tasmania

Things in Australia named after Charles La Trobe:
 HMAS Latrobe, Australian ship
 The La Trobe Journal, scholarly journal of the State Library of Victoria

Other uses
 La Trobe, former name of Latrobe, California

See also
Latrobe (disambiguation)